Andresen v. Maryland, 427 U.S. 463 (1976), was a United States Supreme Court case in which the Court held that search of petitioner's offices for business records, their seizure, and subsequent introduction into evidence did not offend the Fifth Amendment's proscription that “[n]o person … shall be compelled in any criminal case to be a witness against himself.” Although the records seized contained statements that petitioner voluntarily had committed to writing, he was never required to say anything.

See also 
 United States v. Miller, 425 U.S. 435 (1976)
 Fisher v. United States, 425 U.S. 391 (1976)

Further reading

External links 

United States Supreme Court cases
United States Supreme Court cases of the Burger Court
United States Fourth Amendment case law
United States Fifth Amendment self-incrimination case law
1976 in United States case law